Brutus  is a tragedy in five acts by Voltaire. He began work on the play in 1727 in England and completed it in 1729. It premiered on 11 December 1730 in Paris.

Composition
The first part of the work was written in English at Wandsworth while Voltaire was in England, and it was completed on his return to France.  Two and a half years passed before he considered it ready for the stage. Voltaire's lover Adrienne Lecouvreur was meant to play the role of Tullie, but she fell ill and died during rehearsals and had to be replaced by Mlle Dangeville. She was only sixteen years old, and her nervousness did not help the reception of the play.

Action
Voltaire drew his material from the legendary story of the first Roman Consul Lucius Junius Brutus (509 BC). His son, Titus, falls in love with Tullie, daughter of the last Etruscan king of Rome, Lucius Tarquinius Superbus, and through this relationship is led into betraying Rome.  The Senate hands Titus over to his father, who forgives him but insists on his execution to ensure the safety of the Republic.

Critical reception
When the play premiered at the Comédie-Française on December 11, 1730, audience reaction was mixed.  It was criticised for not adhering to the three unities and for the harsh attitude of the character of Brutus. Although the play was well-attended, it was taken off the stage after only fifteen performances. The openly republican theme of the play displeased the authorities, and Voltaire's enemies Prosper Jolyot de Crébillon and the Chevalier de Rohan were actively trying to turn the public against it.  Voltaire left Paris to spend some time privately in Rouen. The play enjoyed a revival during the French Revolution, and the National Convention ordered a performance of Brutus on 2 August 1793 with free admission. in all there were 110 performances at the Comédie-Française between 1730 and 1799.

Printed editions
The first edition was printed in 1731 with Jean-François Josse in Paris, together with a Discours sur la Tragédie by Voltaire, dedicated to Lord Bolingbroke. Thirteen individual editions followed during Voltaire's life, and between 1790 and 1794 twelve further editions were added.

References

External links
 Brutus, Jean-François Josse, Paris, 1731
 complete text of Brutus on Wikisource
 Literature on Brutus, Société des Etudes Voltairiennes
 performances of Brutus on CESAR

Plays by Voltaire
Tragedy plays
1730 in France
1730 plays
Cultural depictions of Lucius Junius Brutus
Plays set in the 6th century BC